Alain van Katwijk (born 2 February 1979) is a Dutch former cyclist. His father Jan, as well as his uncles Piet and Fons, were also professional cyclists.

Palmares

2003
1st Ronde van Overijssel
1st Omloop der Kempen
3rd Omloop van het Houtland
2004
1st  Mountains classification Tour of Belgium
2nd stage 2 Tour Down Under
3rd stage 4 Ster Elektrotoer
2005
9th Paris–Brussels
5th stage 5 Tour of Belgium
2006
2nd Omloop der Kempen
3rd Beverbeek Classic
2007
7th Overall Olympia's Tour
3rd stage 2

References

External links
 
 

Living people
1979 births
Dutch male cyclists
People from Bladel
Cyclists from North Brabant